The Koser Jewelers Tennis Challenge is a tournament for professional female tennis players played on outdoor hardcourts. The event is classified as a $100,000 ITF Women's Circuit tournament and has been held in Landisville, Pennsylvania, since 2008.

Past finals

Singles

Doubles

External links 
 
 ITF search

ITF Women's World Tennis Tour
Recurring sporting events established in 2008
Hard court tennis tournaments in the United States
Tennis in Pennsylvania